Scott Gowans is an Australian rules football coach and coach of the Sydney Swans in the AFL Women's, having previously served as the head coach of the North Melbourne Football Club in the AFL Women's competition (AFLW) between 2019 and 2020.

Coaching career
Gowans coached senior local men's football in West Gippsland as an assistant with Longwarry in the Ellinbank & District Football League in 2013 and 2014, before becoming senior coach during the 2015 and 2016 seasons.

In 2015 and 2016 he also served as the inaugural head coach of the Dandenong Stingrays women's academy side, including in the Stingrays 2016 Youth Girls Academy Challenge premiership win.

Gowans coached the Victoria Country side at the 2016 AFL Youth Girls National Championships before winning the national title with the same side at the 2017 Championships.

Gowans coached Diamond Creek to a grand final appearance in the VFL Women's competition in 2017.

Gowans served as an assistant coach for Carlton during the inaugural 2017 AFL Women's season.

In October 2017, Gowans was appointed as the inaugural coach of North Melbourne's new AFL Women's team, to enter the competition during the 2019 season. In 2018 Gowan crossed to become the head coach of Melbourne University in the VFL Women's competition, as part of the club's partnership with AFLW club, .

On 4 June 2020, Gowans' contract with the North Melbourne Football Club was not renewed.

In October 2020, Gowans joined Collingwood as a senior assistant coach in charge of the midfield.

In February 2022, Gowans was announced as the inaugural senior coach of the Sydney Swans in the AFL Women's competition.

References

External links
Scott Gowans' profile from AustralianFootball.com

Living people
AFL Women's coaches
Year of birth missing (living people)